Birdsall Lime Kiln is a historic structure located northeast of Decorah, Iowa, United States. Its inside walls are lined with locally produced firebrick. The lime was produced from abundant native limestone. It was used in mortar for masonry construction, and by the Winneshiek Paper Company of Freeport, Iowa in its paper-making processes. The structure was listed on the National Register of Historic Places in 1979.

References 

Industrial buildings completed in 1877
Buildings and structures in Winneshiek County, Iowa
National Register of Historic Places in Winneshiek County, Iowa
Industrial buildings and structures on the National Register of Historic Places in Iowa
Lime kilns in the United States
1877 establishments in Iowa